The Mainland and Hong Kong Closer Economic Partnership Arrangement, or Closer Economic Partnership Arrangement (CEPA) for short, is an economic agreement between the Government of the Hong Kong Special Administrative Region and the Central People's Government of the People's Republic of China, signed on 29 June 2003.  A similar agreement, known as the Mainland and Macau Closer Economic Partnership Arrangement, was signed between the Government of the Macau Special Administrative Region and the Central People's Government on 18 October 2003.

Regular supplements have been signed between the Mainland and Hong Kong governments, including Supplement VIII (also referred to as CEPA VIII), which was signed on 13 December 2011 and implemented from 1 April 2012. The most recent supplement, Supplement X, was signed on 29 August 2013.

The two agreements and additional supplements were signed in the Chinese language; the Chinese text is therefore the authoritative text. The Hong Kong government generally provides a courtesy English translation, as English is one of the official languages of Hong Kong.

In the full name of "CEPA", the "Mainland" refers to the customs territory of the People's Republic of China.

Objectives 
CEPA is a free trade agreement pursuant to which qualifying products, companies and residents of Hong Kong enjoy preferential access to the mainland Chinese market. Many of the preferences surpass the concessions made by China upon its accession to the World Trade Organization.

The CEPA document identifies the following objectives:

" To strengthen trade and investment cooperation between Mainland China and Hong Kong and promote joint development of the two sides, through the implementation of the following measures :

 progressively reduce or eliminate tariffs and non-tariff barriers on substantially all the trade in goods between the two sides;
 progressively achieve liberalization of trade in services through reduction or elimination of substantially all discriminatory measures;
 promote trade and investment facilitation. "

See also
 Economic Cooperation Framework Agreement (ECFA)
 Economy of Hong Kong
 Mainland and Macau Closer Economic Partnership Arrangement
 Trade bloc

References

External links
 Mainland and Hong Kong Closer Economic Partnership Arrangement (CEPA)
 Origins: http://www.chamber.org.hk/info/the_bulletin/april2002/cepa.asp
 Analysis of original document: http://www.chamber.org.hk/info/the_bulletin/aug2003/cepaservices.asp

Economy of Hong Kong
Economy of China
Trade blocs
2003 in China
2003 in Hong Kong
Free trade agreements of China
Free trade agreements of Hong Kong
Treaties concluded in 2003
Treaties of the People's Republic of China
Treaties of Hong Kong